Ellen Li Shu-pui  (22 July 1908 – 2 June 2005) was a politician in Hong Kong. She is best known as the first woman to be appointed to the Legislative Council of Hong Kong.

Early life and education
Li was born Ts'o Sau-kuan in 1908 in Saigon, Vietnam. She was educated at the St. Stephen's Girls' College and was among the first women to study business administration at the University of Shanghai. After her education, she worked at the Chinese Maritime Customs before she moved to Hong Kong in 1934. She married Dr. Li Shu-pui, younger brother of Dr. Li Shu-fan, in 1936.

Public life
During the depression years of the 1930s Hong Kong, she worked in the social services and founded the Hong Kong Chinese Women's Club and the Hong Kong Council of Women. She also encouraged and extended the activities of the Young Women's Christian Association, repeatedly serving as president. She also worked in the Family Planning Association and many government committees. She was made member of the Court of the University of Hong Kong in 1948. She was diagnosed of breast cancer in 1962 and was cured after receiving a series of operations.

She was made Justice of the Peace in 1948. In 1964, she was appointed member of the Urban Council of Hong Kong, the first woman to be appointed to the Council. She became the first woman to be appointed to the Legislative Council of Hong Kong in 1965 as a provisional member during the absence of Dhun Jehangir Ruttonjee, and was appointed in July 1966 in place of Kwan Cho-yiu in which she held the position until 1973. She was instrumental in passing the 1971 Marriage (Amendment) Bill, which abolished the polygamy by virtue of the Great Qing Legal Code.

For her services, she received a Doctor of Laws honorary degree. She was awarded Member of the Order of the British Empire (MBE) in 1958 and Officer of the Order of the British Empire in 1964. She became the first woman to receive Commander of the Order of the British Empire (CBE) in 1974. In 1999, she was named Hall of Fame of the International Women's Forum (IWF).

Family and death
Ellen Li married Dr. Li Shu-pui (1903–2005), younger brother of Dr. Li Shu-fan who was also member of the Legislative Council, in 1936. Before her name was Ts'o Sau-kuan, meaning "the most accomplished of the crowd". Dr. Li Shu-pui was the chairman of the Hong Kong Sanatorium and Hospital. The couple had one daughters and two sons.

She died on 2 June 2005 aged 96.

References

1908 births
2005 deaths
Hong Kong women in politics
Members of the Legislative Council of Hong Kong
Members of the Urban Council of Hong Kong
Commanders of the Order of the British Empire
20th-century women politicians
Vietnamese emigrants to Hong Kong